Juxtaposition is an act or instance of placing two elements close together or side by side, often to contrast them. Juxtaposition may also refer to:

Juxtaposition Magazine, a student-run global health magazine at the University of Toronto
Juxtaposition: Barons of Ceti V, a Wintersoft game
Juxtaposability, the possibility in notations to show two related informations side by side

See also
 Juxtaposition Arts, a youth oriented visual art center in Minneapolis, Minnesota, United States
 Juxtapose (disambiguation)